Freedom pineapples was a political and social response in 2021 to a mainland Chinese ban on the importation of pineapples from Taiwan. The response encouraged domestic and international consumption to replace the loss of the Chinese market, which had formerly imported 97% of all Taiwanese pineapple exports. The movement was particularly well received by Taiwanese, Japanese, Australian and American audiences,  but did not fully shield Taiwan from the economic consequences. In 2021, Taiwanese pineapple exports dropped to 55% of their 2019 levels.

Overview
In March 2021, the mainland Chinese government banned the importation of pineapples from Taiwan, citing biosecurity concerns. Chinese customs agents claimed harmful pests were found in recent fruit shipments. At the time, over 90% of Taiwanese pineapple exports went to the Chinese market. 

The Chinese government's claim was questioned and denied by the Taiwanese government. In response to the ban, the Taiwanese government asked the Taiwanese people and diplomatic allies to increase their consumption of Taiwan's pineapples and promised financial assistance to any farmers who saw losses as a result of the ban. The Freedom Pineapple campaign was launched by Foreign Minister Joseph Wu on Twitter.

The term “Freedom pineapples” is a play on Freedom fries.

In 2021, Taiwanese pineapple exports decreased to 28 million metric tons, down to 55% of the 2019 peak of 51 million metric tons.

Response
As a result of the ban Taiwanese pineapples have become a political symbol both at home and in the region.

Within Taiwan
Taiwanese President Tsai Ing-wen launched a social media campaign called "Eat Taiwan's pineapples until you burst," which encouraged citizens to increase their consumption of local pineapples. Restaurants went to great lengths to incorporate pineapple into dishes such as beef noodle soup.

The largest opposition party, the Kuomintang (KMT), has encouraged people to eat more local pineapple.

Taiwanese firms have placed large additional orders for local pineapples.

The situation has resulted in a consolidation of Taiwanese identity across the political spectrum. The import ban followed PRC Premier Li Keqiang’s assurance that the Mainland was seeking to promote peaceful relations with Taiwan, this mixing of messages inflamed public opinion against mainland China.

Taiwanese farmers have begun diverting non-pineapple exports from the Mainland to other markets due to worries that their product could be next.

International
The event received heavy coverage in Japan, with supermarkets selling out of pineapples and large orders being placed. A foodie music group in Japan released a music video about the situation. Sales also increased in Hong Kong which was not subject to the Chinese import ban. The freedom pineapple campaign has also received support in Australia with parallels being drawn to Chinese tariff increases on Australian wine.

Political
The “Freedom Pineapples” initiative received support from the American Institute in Taiwan and the Canadian Trade Office in Taipei, the de facto embassies of allies such as Canada and the United States with the Canadians referencing the Canadian invention pineapple pizza.

In April 2021 former American Secretary of State Mike Pompeo tweeted a picture of himself eating dried Taiwanese pineapple while playing chess using the hashtag #FreedomPineapple.

See also
 Pineapple production in Taiwan
 Freedom fries

References

Cross-Strait relations
Political neologisms
Pineapples
Anti-Chinese sentiment in Asia